Polhovica is a village in the Municipality of Šentjernej in southeastern Slovenia. Its territory extends to the woods west of the main settlement up to the banks of the Krka River. The entire municipality is part of the traditional region of Lower Carniola. It is now included in the Southeast Slovenia Statistical Region.

Church

The local church, built on a slight elevation in the centre of the village, is dedicated to Saint Sigismund and belongs to the parish of Šentjernej. In written documents dating to the 17th century it is mentioned as a Romanesque building that had been recently renovated. The main and the only altar dates to the 19th century. The church was thoroughly renovated from 1998 until 2002.

References

External links

Polhovica on Geopedia

Populated places in the Municipality of Šentjernej